The Bréguet LE or Bréguet Laboratoire Eiffel was a prototype French monoplane fighter built during World War I. The sole aircraft completed crashed on its second flight in 1918, killing the pilot. The program was terminated and the two other aircraft under construction with more powerful engines were broken up.

Specifications (performance data estimated)

Citations

Bibliography

1910s French fighter aircraft
Military aircraft of World War I
LE
Single-engined tractor aircraft
Aircraft first flown in 1918